The 1958 Guild of Television Producers and Directors Awards were the fourth annual giving of the awards which later became known as the British Academy Television Awards. This year saw the expansion of the Awards from their initial four categories to seven. It was the final occasion upon which the Awards were given by the Guild, as the following year the organisation merged with the British Film Academy to form the Society of Film and Television Arts.

Winners
Actor
Michael Hordern
Designer
Stephen Taylor
Drama Production
Rudolph Cartier
Factual
Donald Baverstock and the production team of Tonight (BBC)
Light Entertainment (Production)
Brian Tesler
Light Entertainment (Artist)
Tony Hancock
Personality
Robin Day
Scriptwriter
Colin Morris
Special Award
The production team of Emergency Ward 10 (ATV)
Writers Award
Colin Morris

References
Archive of winners on official BAFTA website (retrieved February 19, 2006).

British Academy Film Awards
Society of Film and Television Arts Television Awards
Society of Film and Television Arts Television Awards
Society of Film and Television Arts Television Awards